The Odeon Cinema is a Grade II listed building immediately west of the city centre of York, in England.

The Odeon Cinemas chain was keen to build a cinema in York, but it could not gain permission to construct a large building within the York city walls. Initial plans were toned down, and the resulting building is almost entirely of brown brick, with none of the tiles which often feature in Harry Weedon's work. Following these changes, permission was granted to build on Blossom Street, just outside the walls.

The building opened as an Odeon Cinema on 1 February 1937. It was designed by Harry Weedon, with the assistance of Robert Bullivant, and with interiors attributed to Lily Deutsch. The construction cost £40,500. On opening, it had 1,484 seats: 934 in the stalls and 550 on the balcony. In 1972, it was converted to have three screens, with the balcony extended forward to form one 800-seat space and the rear of the former stalls split into two smaller screens, each with 111 seats. It was listed in 1981.

The building is in the Art Deco style, and has a low front range, with a three-storey range behind, a tower to the left, and two-storey wings on either side. Part of the front range is occupied by shops. The tower retains an illuminated "Odeon" sign, rendered in Roman capital letters, not the chain's usual style.

Odeon planned to close the cinema in 2003, with a 13,000-name petition leading to a short reprieve. It closed in 2006, but reopened in 2009 as part of the Reel Cinemas chain. In 2017, it was purchased by Everyman Cinemas and renovated to accommodate four screens, each with sofa seating.

The official listing notes that "the architecture ... is well designed and executed, and is a good example of Odeon cinema design" and that original windows survive, along with some original design elements and ancillary rooms. John Brooke Fieldhouse describes it as having "... the overall texture of a building belonging to an ancient civilisation".

References

Art Deco architecture in England
Blossom Street
Buildings and structures completed in 1937
Cinemas in Yorkshire
Grade II listed buildings in York
Grade II listed cinemas
Odeon Cinemas